Eyralpenus postflavida is a moth of the  family Erebidae. It was described by Rothschild in 1933. It is found in the Democratic Republic of Congo.

References

 Natural History Museum Lepidoptera generic names catalog

Spilosomina
Moths described in 1933
Endemic fauna of the Democratic Republic of the Congo